Salman Farsi Dam Salman Farsi Dam is a concrete dam in the center of Fars province on the Qara Aghaj River.  This dam has a capacity of 1400 million cubic meters of water storage and is the largest dam in Fars province.  Salman Farsi Dam as the main source  Drinking water operates in the southern cities and villages of Fars province and has played a significant role in supplying water to the region, especially in recent years in drought conditions.The crown of the dam is in the city of Qir and Karzin and its lake with an area of 4850 hectares is in the city of Jahrom. .

See also

List of power stations in Iran

References

Hydroelectric power stations in Iran